Anis Ayari (born February 16, 1982) is a Tunisian former footballer. He last played for Étoile du Sahel.

Club career
Ayari debuted as a player with Stade Tunisien in March 2002, playing both defence and midfield. Ayari moved from Stade Tunisien in 2004 to Turkish club Samsunspor. He joined French first division side Lorient at the start of 2006-07 but his contract was cancelled in April 2007 by mutual consent.
Later that same season he signed for Étoile du Sahel.

International career
He was a member of the Tunisian 2004 Olympic football team, who exited in the first round, finishing third in group C, behind group and gold medal winners Argentina and runners-up Australia. He was part of the squad that won the 2004 African Cup of Nations.

Honours
Tunisia
 Africa Cup of Nations: 2004

References

External links
 

1982 births
Living people
Tunisian footballers
Tunisia international footballers
Tunisian expatriate footballers
Stade Tunisien players
FC Lorient players
2004 African Cup of Nations players
2005 FIFA Confederations Cup players
2006 Africa Cup of Nations players
2006 FIFA World Cup players
Footballers at the 2004 Summer Olympics
Olympic footballers of Tunisia
Samsunspor footballers
Expatriate footballers in France
Expatriate footballers in Turkey
Tunisian expatriate sportspeople in France
Tunisian expatriate sportspeople in Turkey
Ligue 1 players
Süper Lig players
People from Ben Arous Governorate
Association football defenders
Mediterranean Games gold medalists for Tunisia
Mediterranean Games medalists in football
Competitors at the 2001 Mediterranean Games
21st-century Tunisian people